Przemysłów may refer to the following places in Poland:
Przemysłów, Łódź Voivodeship (central Poland)
Przemysłów, Masovian Voivodeship (east-central Poland)